Masthead may refer to:
 Nameplate (publishing), the banner name on the front page  of a newspaper or periodical (UK "masthead")
 Masthead (American publishing), details of the owners, publisher, departments, officers, contributors and address details on the editorial page of a newspaper or periodical (UK "publisher's imprint")
 Masthead Studios, an eastern-European games developer specializing in massively multiplayer online role-playing games
 The top of a mast (sailing), a tall vertical pole of a ship which supports the sails
 Radio masts and towers, tall structures designed to support antennas (also known as aerials in the UK)
 Masthead rig, a method of rigging a sailing vessel